The Computer Contradictionary is a non-fiction book by Stan Kelly-Bootle that compiles a satirical list of definitions of computer industry terms.  It is an example of "cynical lexicography" in the tradition of Ambrose Bierce's The Devil's Dictionary.  Rather than offering a factual account of usage, its definitions are largely made up by the author.

The book was published in May 1995 by MIT Press and is an update of Kelly-Bootle's The Devil's DP Dictionary which appeared in 1981.

Examples 
Endless loop.  See:  Loop, endless

Loop, endless.  See:   Endless loop

Recursion. See: Recursion

Reception
The Los Angeles Times panned the book, wrote that it was "smartly-titled" but was an "awfully stupid book".  ACM Computing Reviews recommended dipping into it because "a dictionary is a difficult read".

References

Satirical books
MIT Press books
1995 books
Computer humor